Youssef Naciri (born 10 December 1993) is a Moroccan footballer.

Career
Naciri played at both Monroe College and Christian Brothers University, before signing his first professional contract with United Soccer League side Harrisburg City Islanders on April 8, 2016.

References

External links
 

1993 births
Christian Brothers University alumni
Living people
Moroccan footballers
Footballers from Casablanca
Moroccan expatriate footballers
Penn FC players
Association football midfielders
USL Championship players
Expatriate soccer players in the United States
Harrisburg Heat players
Major Arena Soccer League players
Moroccan expatriate sportspeople in the United States
Expatriate footballers in Iceland
Moroccan expatriate sportspeople in Iceland
Monroe Mustangs men's soccer players
Christian Brothers Buccaneers and Lady Buccaneers